Harry L. Sauce, Jr. (born September 2, 1946) is an attorney, former circuit judge of Hamilton County, Indiana, and a former American racing driver, primarily in SCCA.

Born in Jackson, Mississippi, Sauce received a B.A. in political science from Ole Miss, and J.D. from the Indiana University Maurer School of Law in 1972. He was a judge of the Indiana Circuit Court for 15 years, from 1975 to 1990. Sauce drove one race in the ARS series, and tried to race in Indy car racing, but was unsuccessful. He is sometimes ridiculed in auto racing circles for his lack of experience.

Sauce entered into the Indianapolis 500 twice (1983 and 1988), but he did not qualify either time. In 1983, his entry was declined due to not having enough experience. In 1988, he returned and tried to take his rookie test. On the final phase of his rookie test, he spun out and slid into the grass in turn one. Two days later, he withdrew from the event.

He continued to race SCCA into the 2000s, but was injured in a crash in 2008. He continues to be a partner in his law firm Sauce & Tardy in Noblesville, Indiana.

Racing record

SCCA National Championship Runoffs

American open–wheel racing results
(key) (Races in bold indicate pole position) (Races in italics indicate fastest lap)

American Racing Series

Indy 500 results

References

Champ Car drivers
Indy Lights drivers
Living people
1946 births
Formula Ford drivers
SCCA National Championship Runoffs participants